Ivanovci may refer to several places:

In Croatia
Ivanovci, Osijek-Baranja County, a village near Valpovo
Ivanovci, Požega-Slavonia County, a village near Čaglin
Ivanovci Đakovački, formerly, Ivanovci Gorjanski, a village near Đakovo
Marjanski Ivanovci, a village near Marijanci
In Slovenia
Ivanovci, Moravske Toplice
in Serbia
Ivanovci (Ljig)